Battle of Sacheon may refer to:
 Battle of Sacheon (1592)
 Battle of Sacheon (1598)